Speller is a surname. Notable people with the surname include:

Bob Speller (born 1956), Canadian politician
Cara Speller, British film and television producer
Cody Speller (born 1994), Canadian professional football player
Émile Speller (1875–1952), Luxembourgish military officer
Frank Speller, American organist and academic
Frank Newman Speller (1875–1968), Canadian-born American metallurgical engineer
Fred Speller (1863–1909), English footballer
Georgia Speller (1931–1987), African American artist
Henry Speller (1900–1997), American artist and blues musician
Sylvia Speller (born 1967), German physicist
Tony Speller (1929–2013), British politician